Irdemousa (also Romanized as Irde Mūsá; also known as Īrdī Mūsá, Ardi Musa, Erdī Mūsá, and Īrd Mūsī) is a village in Sabalan Rural District of Sabalan District, Sareyn County, Ardabil province, Iran. At the 2006 census, its population was 725 in 158 households. The following census in 2011 counted 789 people in 249 households. The latest census in 2016 showed a population of 816 people in 279 households; it was the largest village in its rural district. Cities, towns and places near Irdemousa include Kolur. The closest major cities include Ardabil, Tabriz, Rasht, and Zanjan.

References

External links 

Tageo

Parsabad County

Towns and villages in Parsabad County

Populated places in Ardabil Province

Populated places in Parsabad County